Jari Sailio (born 18 March 1986 in Hyvinkää) is a Finnish professional ice hockey forward currently playing for Oulun Kärpät in the Finnish Liiga.

Sailio joined the Blues after a season with Arystan Temirtau in the Kazakhstan Hockey Championship He agreed to an initial three-month try-out contract with the Blues, before signing a one-year deal on 30 August 2014. He previously played for Blues of the Liiga in the 2010–11 season.

References

External links
 

1986 births
Living people
Arystan Temirtau players
Espoo Blues players
HIFK (ice hockey) players
HPK players
Oulun Kärpät players
Ritten Sport players
Finnish ice hockey forwards
People from Hyvinkää
Sportspeople from Uusimaa